Warnings is the third studio album by Swedish indie rock band I Break Horses. It was released on 8 May 2020 under Bella Union.

Critical reception
Warnings was met with universal acclaim reviews from critics. At Metacritic, which assigns a weighted average rating out of 100 to reviews from mainstream publications, this release received an average score of 81, based on 11 reviews.

Accolades

Track listing

References

2020 albums
Bella Union albums
I Break Horses albums